Bernard 'Barney' Daniels (born 24 November 1950) is an English former professional footballer. He made appearances in The Football League for three clubs in the 1970s.

Playing career
Daniels was a product of Manchester United's youth policy but he left for non-league side Ashton United after failing to make any league appearances.

He later returned to professional football with Manchester City, featuring in the top-flight of English football before becoming Chester's record signing at £20,000 in the summer of 1975. Daniels began his Chester career in positive fashion by scoring from 25 yards against Southend United in his new club's first ever home game in Football League Division Three but he was at the centre of controversy just days later when he tore off his shirt after being substituted against Wrexham and threw it towards the dugout.

After failing to land a regular place in the side, Daniels was to quickly move on to Stockport County before returning to Ashton.

External links

Bibliography

References

1950 births
Living people
Footballers from Salford
English Football League players
Association football forwards
English footballers
Manchester United F.C. players
Ashton United F.C. players
Manchester City F.C. players
Chester City F.C. players
Stockport County F.C. players